Kenneth Hay (19 April 1927 – 9 July 2002) was a South African cricketer. He played in eleven first-class matches for Border from 1952/53 to 1955/56.

See also
 List of Border representative cricketers

References

External links
 

1927 births
2002 deaths
South African cricketers
Border cricketers
People from Queenstown, South Africa
Cricketers from the Eastern Cape